Lost in the Garden is a midlife-crisis novel by the American writer Philip Beard.

Set in contemporary Pittsburgh, Pennsylvania, it tells the story of 45-year-old Michael Benedict, who after the failure of his marriage, moves back with his parents and sets himself a goal of breaking 70 in his golf game and making the Champions Tour by age 50.

References

2006 American novels

Novels set in Pittsburgh
Novels about golf
Novels about midlife crisis
Viking Press books